Bear Lake State Park (sometimes called North Beach State Park) is a public recreation area bordering the north and eastern shores of Bear Lake in the southeast corner of Bear Lake County, Idaho, near the Utah and Wyoming state lines. Bear Lake National Wildlife Refuge lies adjacent to the park's north unit.

History
The state purchased land for the park in 1969 using funds supplied through the Recreation and Public Purposes Act. At the same time, the North Beach unit was leased from Utah Power and Light. Management of the north unit continues under lease from PacifiCorp.

Wildlife
This state park is home to bonneville cisco, cutthroat trout, moose, pelicans, lake trout, deer, cranes and cougar.

Features
Bear Lake owes its turquoise blue color to the presence of suspended calcium carbonate (limestone). Camping is offered in the east unit. In winter, the park provides ice fishing access for the annual runs of Bonneville cisco.

See also

 List of Idaho state parks
 National Parks in Idaho

References

External links

 Bear Lake State Park Idaho Parks and Recreation 
 Bear Lake State Park Location Map Idaho Parks and Recreation

State parks of Idaho
Protected areas of Bear Lake County, Idaho
Provincial and state parks in the Rocky Mountains
Protected areas established in 1969
1969 establishments in Idaho